Silylation is the introduction of one or more (usually) substituted silyl groups (R3Si) to a molecule. The process is the basis of organosilicon chemistry.

Of organic compounds
Alcohols, carboxylic acids, amines, thiols, and phosphates can be silylated. The process involves the replacement of a proton with a trialkylsilyl group, typically trimethylsilyl (-SiMe3). Generally the substrate is deprotonated with a suitable strong base followed by treatment with a silyl chloride (e.g. trimethylsilyl chloride). Often strong bases such butyl lithium or a Grignard reagent are used, as illustrated by the synthesis of a trimethylsilyl ethers as protecting groups from an alcohol:
ROH + BuLi → ROLi + BuH
ROLi + Me3SiCl → ROSiMe3 + LiCl

Bis(trimethylsilyl)acetamide ("BSA", Me3SiNC(OSiMe3)Me is an efficient silylation agent used for the derivatisation of compounds. The reaction of BSA with alcohols gives the corresponding trimethylsilyl ether, together with N-(trimethylsilyl)acetamide as a byproduct:
ROH + Me3SiNC(OSiMe3)Me → Me3SiN(H)C(O)Me + ROSiMe3

The introduction of a silyl group(s) gives derivatives of enhanced volatility, making the derivatives suitable for analysis by gas chromatography and electron-impact mass spectrometry (EI-MS).  For EI-MS, the silyl derivatives give more favorable diagnostic fragmentation patterns of use in structure investigations, or characteristic ions of use in trace analyses employing selected ion monitoring and related techniques.

Desilylation
Desilylation is the reverse of silylation: the silyl group is exchanged for a proton. Various fluoride salts (e.g. sodium, potassium, tetra-n-butylammonium fluorides) are popular for this purpose.
ROSiMe3  +  F−  +  H2O   →   ROH  +  FSiMe3  +  OH−

Of metals

Coordination complexes with silyl ligands are well known.  An early example is CpFe(CO)2Si(CH3)3, prepared by a salt metathesis reaction from trimethylsilyl chloride and CpFe(CO)2Na.  Typical routes include oxidative addition of Si-H bonds to low-valent metals.  Metal silyl complexes are intermediates in hydrosilation, a process used to make organosilicon compounds on both laboratory and commercial scales.

See also
 Silyl ether
 Hydrosilylation

References

External links 
Identification of Silylation Artifacts in Derivatization Reactions for Gas Chromatography
 Desilylation methods

Chemical processes
Organosilicon compounds